Renan Gorne Silva (born 22 February 1996) is a Brazilian footballer who plays as a forward for Remo.

Career
Gorne played with the Botafogo Under-20 side in the 2015–2016, scoring 31 goals which earned him an appearance with the first team squad. Gorne was loaned to North American Soccer League side North Carolina FC on 3 August 2017. Gorne has had a declining career for unknown reasons.

Honours

Paysandu
Copa Verde: 2018

Confiança
Campeonato Sergipano: 2020

Remo
Copa Verde: 2021

References

External links

1996 births
Living people
Footballers from Rio de Janeiro (city)
Brazilian footballers
Association football forwards
Campeonato Brasileiro Série A players
Campeonato Brasileiro Série B players
Campeonato Brasileiro Série C players
Botafogo de Futebol e Regatas players
Paysandu Sport Club players
Volta Redonda FC players
Associação Desportiva Confiança players
North American Soccer League players
North Carolina FC players
Brazilian expatriate footballers
Brazilian expatriate sportspeople in the United States
Expatriate soccer players in the United States